Microsoft Symbol Server is a Windows technology used to obtain symbol debugging information. It is built by using the SymSrv technology that is bundled with the Debugging Tools for Windows package. The SymChk.exe utility can be used to verify symbols and to build a local symbol cache in a convenient, supposedly non-invasive way. This utility is included with the Debugging Tools for Windows. Visual Studio 2005 and later can be set up to use the Microsoft Symbol Server. The symbol server technology is built into Debugging Tools for Windows.

References

External links 
 Debugging with Symbols (Windows) MSDN

Symbol Server